At least two ships have borne the name RMS St Helena:

Ship names